Actinic conjunctivitis is an inflammation of the eye contracted from prolonged exposure to actinic (ultraviolet) rays.  Symptoms are redness and swelling of the eyes.  Most often the condition is caused by prolonged exposure to Klieg lights, therapeutic lamps or acetylene torches.  Other names for the condition include Klieg conjunctivitis, eyeburn, arc-flash, welder's conjunctivitis, flash keratoconjunctivitis, actinic ray ophthalmia, X-ray ophthalmia and ultraviolet ray ophthalmia.

Symptoms
Conjunctivitis eye condition contracted from exposure to actinic rays. Symptoms are redness and swelling.

Causes
Conjunctivitis is prevalent among children of the highlands of Ecuador. The finding supports the hypothesis that prolonged exposure to the sun at altitude, in the less dense atmosphere (with the resultant lower UV absorption), is one cause of the condition.

Diagnosis

Management

See also 
 Conjunctivitis
 Photokeratitis

References

External links 

Eye diseases
Inflammations
Disorders of conjunctiva